In the Spirit World Now is the sixth studio album by American punk rock band Ceremony. It was released through Relapse Records on August 23, 2019.

Critical reception
In the Spirit World Now was met with generally favorable reviews from critics. At Metacritic, which assigns a weighted average rating out of 100 to reviews from mainstream publications, this release received an average score of 71, based on 7 reviews.

Track listing

Charts

References

2019 albums
Ceremony (punk band) albums
Relapse Records albums